Mallery Lake is a lake in Kivalliq Region in the Canadian territory of Nunavut. The Kunwak River flows into it from the southwest and drains it in the southeast. Lake trout and lake whitefish inhabit the lake, and caribou hunting is occasionally practised around the lake in the winter.

References

Lakes of Kivalliq Region